The Canberra Challenger is a tennis tournament held in Canberra, Australia since 2016. The event is part of the ATP Challenger Tour and is played on outdoor hard courts.

Past finals

Singles

Doubles

References

External links 

 Official website

ATP Challenger Tour 
Hard court tennis tournaments
Tennis tournaments in Australia
Sports competitions in Canberra